Labo Airport (Cebuano: Tugpahanan sa Labo; Filipino: Paliparan ng Labo), also known as Ozamiz Airport, is an airport serving the general area of the city of Ozamiz in the Philippines. It is the only airport in the province of Misamis Occidental. The airport is classified as a community airport by the Civil Aviation Authority of the Philippines, a body of the Department of Transportation that is responsible for the operations of not only this airport but also of all other airports in the Philippines except the major international airports. It is one of only two community airports in the Philippines with commercial operations, but one of the busiest in Mindanao in terms of aircraft movement and passenger traffic.

The airport takes its name from its location, Barangay Labo in Ozamiz City.

Ozamiz Airport also serves the cities of Oroquieta and Tangub, some municipalities of Zamboanga del Sur, Lanao del Norte and some parts of Lanao del Sur.

History 

It was known as Misamis Airfield during the Pre-World War II and Post-World War II until the municipality received cityhood status in 1948 and was changed to Ozamiz Airport. Philippine Airlines, the first airline to operate the airport, served regular air service to this airport using the McDonnell Douglas DC-3 from Manila. In the 1980s-90's, Philippine Airlines used their Fokker 50 and Sunriser planes to/from Manila and Cebu until the closure of the airport.

The airport was closed in 1998 after Philippine Airlines stopped the operation of their smaller Fokker and Sunriser planes because its runway could not accommodate jetliners and wide-bodied aircraft.

On July 11, 2007, Ozamiz Airport was re-opened to the public with former President Gloria Macapagal Arroyo and the Provincial and City Officials joining the ceremonial event. PAL's subsidiary, PAL Express (then known as Air Philippines), was the first airline to land using the Boeing 737-200, the first jet plane to land during the opening of the airport.

On November 10, 2008, Cebu Pacific Air launched its Ozamiz-Cebu using their ATR 72-500.

On June 16, 2009, after the expansion, widening of the runway, and passing the runway jet requirement, a Cebu Pacific Airbus A319 successfully landed at the airport.

Currently, the airport is serving Manila flights using Cebu Pacific's and PAL Express' Airbus A320. While Cebu flights are only operated by Cebgo's ATR 72-600.

Rehabilitation and expansion 
Extension and expansion of the airport runway started in 2005 using congressional funds of Misamis Occidental District 2 Congresswoman Herminia Ramiro. It was reopened to commercial flights on July 8, 2007, with Air Philippines offering direct Ozamiz-Manila routes.

Expansion and development of the airport particularly its runway, tarmac and passenger terminal building continued on the First Quarter of 2008.

In July 2009, implementation of the asphalt overlay began  for the entire runway, apron and taxiway. This includes the setting up of runway lights to accommodate night flight operations.

On November 29, 2018, President Rodrigo Duterte led the groundbreaking ceremony of the new passenger terminal as part of the modernization project of the airport. The entire cost of the project is about P922 million. It is also part of the Build! Build! Build! program of the administration.

Airlines and destinations

Statistics

References

External links

Google Maps Satellite imagery of Labo Airport

Airports in the Philippines
Buildings and structures in Ozamiz
Transportation in Mindanao
Misamis Occidental